The Oracle iPlanet Web Proxy Server (OiWPS), formerly known as Sun Java System Web Proxy Server (SJSWPS), is a proxy server software developed by Sun Microsystems (since 2010, Oracle Corporation).

Overview

The Oracle iPlanet Web Proxy Server, is a popular HTTP/1.1 Proxy server software developed by Sun Microsystems. OiWPS 4.0 is widely used for proxying, caching, and filtering web content, boosting network security and performance, as well as to protect and secure, and load balance across, content servers.

History

Earlier known as Sun ONE Web Proxy server, the Sun Java System Web Proxy Server 4.0 is a major rewrite of the older 3.x version of Sun's Proxy server, formerly known as Netscape Proxy Server.

The Netscape Proxy Server version 3.x was essentially a coupling between the Netscape browser client, responsible for talking to remote servers, and the Netscape web server 4.x, which in turn handled the duty of talking to a client. Support for multithreading was absent, and the Proxy server operated in multi-process mode where each request was handled by a dedicated process.

Sun Java System Web Proxy server 4.0 resulted from a major rewrite of Netscape Proxy Server in 2003–2004, when Sun decided to reinvest in Proxy technology. Switching to Sun web server 6.1's core architecture brought in support for multi-threading while still allowing users to configure the server for multiple processes when so desired. A brand new http client, admin and installer GUI, and localization were the other major changes involved. 4.0 retained other significant features of 3.x such as the ftp client, gopher client, connect client, batch updates, and so on.

After acquisition of Sun Microsystems by Oracle Corporation in 2010, Sun Java System Web Proxy Server 4.0 was rebranded as Oracle iPlanet Web Proxy Server 4.0.

Features

Recently added features

Supported Platforms

Currently supported platforms:

Version 4.0.16 deprecated support for the following platforms:

Product updates as Oracle iPlanet Web Proxy Server 

4.0.14 was the first release with Oracle-specific rebranding changes.

As of October 2016:

4.0.20 is the latest stable version suitable for new installations.

4.0.27 is the latest patch available.

Oracle iPlanet Web Proxy Server 4.0 now supports the following new features:

More information on new features, platforms support, and resolved issues can be found in the product release notes

ICAP Support 

While Oracle iPlanet Proxy Server 4.0.17 does not provide official Internet Content Adaptation Protocol (ICAP) support yet, version 4.0.17 is capable of talking to ICAP servers.

Official support may be added in a future release, subject to market demand and business justification.

See also 
 Oracle Technology Network
 Oracle Fusion Middleware
 Oracle iPlanet Web Server

External links 
 Oracle iPlanet Web Proxy Server product page
 FAQ: Oracle iPlanet Web Proxy Server
 System Requirements and Supported Platforms for Oracle iPlanet Web Proxy Server 4.0.14+
 Release Downloads for Oracle iPlanet Web Proxy Server
 Oracle iPlanet Web Proxy Server 4.0.19 Release Notes

Proxy servers